Iran competed at the 2020 Winter Youth Olympics in Lausanne, Switzerland from 9 to 22 January 2020.

Alpine skiing

Boys

Girls

Cross-country skiing

Boys

Girls

Ski mountaineering

Individual

Sprint

Mixed

See also
Iran at the 2020 Summer Olympics

References

2020 in Iranian sport
Nations at the 2020 Winter Youth Olympics
Iran at the Youth Olympics